Shaikh Ibrahim (Turkish: Şıh İbrahim) is a Turkmen village in Tel Afar District, Nineveh Governorate, Iraq.

There is a mountain in the area of the same name to the northeast of the town, Jebel Shaikh Ibrahim.

References

External links
Maplandia

Populated places in Nineveh Governorate
Turkmen communities in Iraq